This is a list of museums in Guinea.

Museums in Guinea 
 Musée National de Sandervalia
 Musée Préfectoral de Boké
Musée Préfectoral de Kankan
 Musée Préfectoral de Kissidougou
 Musée Préfectoral de Koundara
 Musée Préfectoral de N'zerekore
 Petit Musée du Fouta

See also 
 List of museums

 
Guinea
Museums
Museums
Guinea